South Africa was represented at the 2006 Commonwealth Games in Melbourne by an unknown member strong contingent, consisting of athletes and various officials.

Medals

Gold
  Men's 4 × 100 m Freestyle Relay: Lyndon Ferns, Ryk Neethling, Roland Schoeman and Gerhard Zandberg sets up a Games record of 3:14.97, beating Australia (silver) and Canada (bronze).
 Women's 50 m EAD Freestyle: Natalie du Toit bettered the existing record twice (during Heat 2 and Final A) to 29.27 seconds.
 Men's 50 m Butterfly: Roland Schoeman
 Women's 100 m EAD Freestyle: Natalie du Toit
 Women's Javelin: Sunette Viljoen
 Men's Shot put: Janus Robberts
 Men's 50 m Freestyle: Roland Schoeman
 Women's Discus: Elizna Naude
 Women's Trap: Diane Swanton
 Men's 400 m Hurdles: Louis van Zyl
 Women's High Jump: Anika Smith
 Welterweight 69 kg: Bongani Mwelase

Silver
 Men's 200 m Backstroke: Johannes du Rand
 Men's 100 m Freestyle: Ryk Neethling
 Women's 100 m: Geraldine Pillay
 Men's 100 m EAD: Hilton Langenhoven
 Men's 400 m Hurdles: Alwyn Myburgh
 Men's 200 m EAD: David Roos
 Women's 50 m Rifle 3 Positions: Esmari van Reenen
 Men's Double Trap: Byron Swanton
 Men's Triple Jump: Khotso Mokoena
 Men's 4 × 100 m Relay
 Men's 4 × 400 m Relay
 Flyweight 51 kg: Jackson van Tonder Chauke
 Men's Road Race: David George

Bronze
 Men's 50 m Backstroke: Gerhard Zandberg
 Women's 50 m Butterfly: Lize-Mari Retief ties with Alice Mills of Australia
 Women's 200 m Breaststroke: Suzaan van Biljon
 Men's 25 m Standard Pistol Pairs: Allan Stuart McDonald and Daniel Francois van Tonder obtain a total of 1106, just behind Australia's 1112 and India's 1139.
 Men's 100 m Freestyle: Roland Schoeman
 Men's Lawn Bowls Triples: South Africa
 Men's 25 m Centre Fire Pistol Pairs: Allan Stuart McDonald and Daniel Francois van Tonder obtain a total of 1135, just behind England's 1138 and India's 1150.
 Men's 1500 m Freestyle: Troyden Prinsloo
 Women's Floor: Francki van Rooyen
 Women's 75 kg Weightlifting: Babalwa Ndleleni, becoming the first black woman to win a medal for the country at the Games.
 Women's 200 m: Geraldine Pillay
 Men's Hammer Throw: Christiaan Harmse
 Women's Lawn Bowls Singles: Lorna Trigwell

South Africa's Team at the 2006 Commonwealth Games

Athletics

Men's Competition
Sherwin Vries (100 m, 4 × 100 m)
Leigh Julius (200 m, 4 × 100 m)
Snyman Prinsloo (200 m, 4 × 100 m)
Paul Gorries (400 m, 4 × 400 m)
Jan van der Merwe (400 m, 4 × 400 m)
Ofentse Mogawane (400 m, 4 × 400 m)
Mbulaeni Mulaudzi (800 m)
Tshamano Setone (5000 m)
Boy Soke (5000 m)
Ruben Ramolefi (3000 m steeplechase)
Emmanuel Mkhabela (3000 m steeplechase
Shaun Bownes (110 m hurdles)
Ruan de Vries (110 m hurdles)
Hennie Kotze (110 m hurdles)
LJ van Zyl (4 × 400 m, 400 m hurdles)
Pieter de Villiers (4 × 400 m, 400 m hurdles)
Alwyn Myburgh (400 m hurdles, 4 × 400 m)
Tseko Mpolokeng (marathon)
Neo Molema (marathon)
Okkert Brits (pole vault)
Khotso Mokoena (long jump, triple jump)
Martin McClintock (long jump)
Yaw Fosu Amoah (long jump)
Hardus Pienaar (javelin)
Robert Oosthuizen (javelin)
Lohan Rautenbach (javelin)
Chris Harmse (hammer throw)
Hannes Hopley (discus)
Janus Robberts (shot put)
Ramsay Carelse (high jump)
Lee Roy Newton (4 × 100 m)
Ruben Majola (4 × 400 m)
Hilton Langenhoven (T12 100 m)
Joseph van Nel (T12 100 m)
David Roos (T46 200 m)

Women's Competition
Geraldine Pillay (100 m, 200 m)
Adri Schoeman (400 m, 4 × 400 m)
Estie Wittstock (400 m, 4 × 400 m)
Surita Febbraio (400 m hurdles, 4 × 400 m)
Lebogang Phalula (800 m, 1500 m)
Dina Lebo Phalula (800 m, 1500 m)
Marlene Breytenbach (1500 m)
Nolene Conrad (3000 m steeplechase)
Tebogo Masehla (3000 m steeplechase)
Nicolene Cronje (20 km walk)
Suzanne Erasmus (20 km walk)
Tanith Maxwell (marathon)
Charne Rademeyer (marathon)
Elizna Naudé (discus)
Anika Smit (high jump)
Marli Knoetze (shot put)
Simone du Toit (shot put)
Sunette Viljoen (javelin)
Samantha Dodd (pole vault)
Janice Josephs (heptathlon)
Tsholofelo Selemela (4 × 400 m)
Amanda Kotze (4 × 400 m)
Dominique Vogel (T38 100 m)
Thuliswa Mlinganiso (T38 100 m)

Basketball

Men's team competition
Team roster
Quintin Denyssen
Vusi Dlamini
Pat Engelbrecht
Thabang Kgwedi
Emmanuel Madondo
Nakedi Maputla
Brendan Mettler
Kenneth Motaung
Neo Mothiba
Sipho Ngcobo
Nyakallo Nthuping
Chris Treurnicht

Cycling
Mountain Bike
Justice Makhale
Burry Stander

Road/Time Trial
Ryan Cox
David George
Jock Green
Robert Hunter
Jeremy Maartens
Rupert Rheeder

Track
Durwan Benjamin
Garth Thomas

Gymnastics
Maureen van Rooyen
Christian Brezeanu
Steven Friedman
Troy Sender
Gerhard Swiegers
Candice Cronje
Chanel Moonsammy
Francki van Rooyen
Rinette Whelpton
Shalene Arnold
Odette Richard
Stephanie Sandler
Mirriam Letsele

Field Hockey

Men's team competition
Team roster
 Chris Hibbert
 Franci du Plessis
 Ken Forbes
 Kyle Rhodes
 Darryn Gallagher
 Bruce Jacobs
 John Paul
 Wayne Madsen
 Lungile Tsolekile
 Jody Paul
 Clyde Abrahams
 Ian Symons
 Leroy Phillips
 Charles Rose-Innes
 Reece Basson
 Justin Reid-Ross
Head coach: Paul Revington

Women's Team Competition
Team roster
 Caroline Jack
 Mariette Rix
 Kate Hector
 Nita Van Jaarsveldt
 Tarryn Hosking
 Lenise Marals
 Lesle-Ann George
 Marsha Marescia
 Tarryn Bright
 Kathleen Taylor
 Sharne Wehmeyer
 Lindsey Carlisle
 Henna du Buisson
 Fiona Butler
 Liesel Dorothy
 Jenny Wilson
Head coach: Jenny King

Lawn Bowls

Men's Competition
Team roster
Shaun Addinall
Gerry Baker
Neil Burkett
Kevin Campbell
Eric Johannes
Gidion Vermuelen

Women's Competition
Team roster
Rika Lynn
Susan Nel
Trish Steyn
Lorna Trigwell
Loraine Victor
Colleen Webb

Netball
Sindisiwe Gumede
Nontle Gwavu
Lizanne Helmand
Adele Niemand
Simnikiwe Malusi
Christine Markgraaf
Zanele Mdodana
Nthabiseng Moabi
Martha Mosoahle
Charlene Hertzog
Karin Venter
Leigh-Ann Zackey

Rugby Sevens

Men's team competition
Team roster
Schalk van der Merwe (Golden Lions)
Ryan Kankowski (Natal Sharks)
Tobela Mdaka (Griffons)
Jonathan Mokuena (Leopards)
Zolani Mofu (Border)
Stefan Basson (Vodacom Blue Bulls)
Phillip Burger (Vodacom Cheetahs)
Mzwandile Stick (Natal Sharks)
Gio Aplon (Vodacom Western Province)
Jaco Pretorius (Falcons)
Antonius Verhoeven (Boland)
Fabian Juries (Eastern Province)

Shooting
Neels Bornman
Etienne Cilliers
Georgios Eleftheriou
Byron Swanton
Diane Swanton
Nicolaas Swart
Johan du Toit
Robert Hayter
Mohyedien Begg
Allan McDonald
Daniel van Tonder
Martin Senore
Esmari van Reenen
Gavin van Rhyn
Marli Vlok

Squash
Diana Argyle
Rodney Durbach
Adrian Hansen
Clinton Leeuw
Tenille Swartz
Craig van der Wath

Table Tennis
Luke Abrahams
Theo Cogill
Shireen Lyners
Sameera Maal
Alet Moll (EAD)
Shane Overmeyer
Rosabelle Riese

Triathlon
Hendrik de Villiers
Mari Rabie
Kate Roberts
Brad Storm

Weightlifting
Alphonso Adonis
Darryn Anthony
Ricardo Fitzpatrick (EAD)
Greg Gerts
Babalwa Ndeleni
Evgeni Popov (EAD)
Mona Pretorius
Portia Vries

External links
 Medal Winners for South Africa, from Melbourne2006.com.au
Competitors List

Nations at the 2006 Commonwealth Games
Commonwealth Games
2006